Kyra Marie Christine Kyrklund  (born 30 November 1951 in Helsinki) is a Finnish dressage rider and trainer who currently lives in West Sussex. In 1991 she and "Matador II" won the World Cup Finals in Paris. She has competed in six Olympics.

See also
List of athletes with the most appearances at Olympic Games

External links 
Kyra Kyrklund's website (In English)

Finnish dressage riders
Equestrians at the 1980 Summer Olympics
Equestrians at the 1984 Summer Olympics
Equestrians at the 1988 Summer Olympics
Equestrians at the 1992 Summer Olympics
Equestrians at the 1996 Summer Olympics
Equestrians at the 2008 Summer Olympics
Finnish female equestrians
Olympic equestrians of Finland
Sportspeople from West Sussex
Sportspeople from Helsinki
1951 births
Living people
Swedish-speaking Finns
Dressage trainers
Finnish expatriate sportspeople in England